The Lanchester Eighteen at first known as the 15/18 was announced at the beginning of October 1931. Quite unlike any previous Lanchester it was their first new car following BSA's takeover of The Lanchester Motor Company Limited in January 1931. A medium sized car was a new departure for Lanchester. 

The intention was to extend the BSA group's range of cars into a new price level by offering a car of moderate size and price providing economies by virtue of design and workmanship. This was the first medium sized car to be offered with the Daimler fluid flywheel and Wilson half-automatically changing gearbox which was separately mounted.

Design
George Lanchester played a considerable part in development of this car in collaboration with L H Pomeroy. Their original concept had been a fairly small car but one still redolent of Lanchester luxury selling for about £850. In the end the standard saloon was priced at £565.

The clutch used to engage top gear gave considerable trouble in early production cars and twice had to be replaced with redesigned versions. The (then) advanced pushrod overhead valve gear proved a success and was used in later Daimlers beginning with the Fifteen which was given a similar engine.

Specification
Further detail

Engine
Carburettor is mounted on the off side (right)
Inlet manifold is circular, has four branches and is held above and to the centre of the 3-branch exhaust manifold
Crankshaft and camshaft run in seven and six bearings respectively
Timing by chain at the back of the engine
Valves have single springs, pushrods are on the nearside (left), the rocker cover is easily removed by hand
Lubrication is fully forced and the gear type oil pump is driven vertically in tandem with the ignition distributor from a single skew gear on the camshaft
All the oil passes through a felt flter which can be detached externally
The film(sic) radiator has a honeycomb front and a fan and impeller are combined and driven by belt from the front end of the camshaft. The radiator is enclosed with a separate shell. There is no thermostat device (15/18)
Dynamo is mounted on the front end of the crankshaft

Mechanical fuel pump
Automatic and hand control for the coil ignition

A redesigned engine of 2390 cc was announced on 21 September 1934 for the Olympia Show

Transmission
The fluid flywheel transmits power through a short splined metal universally-jointed shaft to the separately mounted Wilson epicyclic gearbox
Four forward speeds
Propeller shaft is open, back axle has half-floating underslung worm drive

Chassis
The frame has cruciform bracing in the middle and lattice type stiffening on the inside of all channel members at vital points giving strength with weight reduction.
Steering by cam gear, the column is adjustable for rake
Lockheed hydraulic brakes and a vacuum servo are fitted to all four wheels and a handbrake is fitted on the transmission behind the gearbox
Brake drums are almost entirely carried within the plane of the wheels and the springs a set closer to the wheels
Springs are half-elliptical and have gaiters and hydraulic shock absorbers with silent-bloc bushes for the shackles
Front springs are shackled forward to harmonize the motion with the steering link, back springs are underhung
Wire wheels carry 5.25 by 18inch tyres
12-volt electrical system
Changes for the Eighteen:
Front half-elliptical springs are of low periodicity type with radius rod controlled front axle and a harmonic stabilising front bumper
The four-wheel brakes are mechanical and the pull-up hand lever works the brakes at the back

Performance
On Autocar road test published in April 1932 the testers obtained a properly timed maximum speed of 71.43 mph.

Comfortable amenities
Said The Times' motoring correspondent—The four/five seater standard saloon has three armrests in the back seat and the front adjustable bucket seats have recesses in their backs for additional toe room for rear passengers. The four doors open wide down to the running boards and the glasses in them can be wound down fully in front (the driver's has a quick-action handle) and three-quarters of the way in the rear doors. The rear-most quarter-lights are fixed. A cupboard with a door is provided either side of the grouped instruments and there is a flap pocket in each rear door. Traps are fitted in the back floorboard for access to the tools, the battery and the oil tank of the hydraulic braking system. The spare wheel and tyre are in the well on the off-side front wing. The windscreen opens fully and the wipers are electrically operated. Safety glass is provided throughout. The coachwork sits low being built outside and below the top of the frame and attached by metal holders with rubber.

Prices
chassis £435
six-light saloon £565
four-light saloon £565
sports saloon £675
town carriage £795

Bigger engine for 1936
An increase of engine size from 2390 cc to 2565 cc was announced on 14 August 1935.

Facelift for 1937
The new frontal design used on the group's other cars has been employed on the Eighteen. As an alternative to independent front suspension the front beam axle is now controlled by parallel links.

The wheelbase has been reduced 1 inch to 9'6" =  and the track increased 4 inches to 4'8" = .

The manufacturer now estimates the fuel consumption to be 18 mpg

New for 1938
While the engine and chassis were only altered in detail completely new coachwork was announced in August 1937. It included a luggage boot at the back and the door or lid forms a baggage platform. The seating and upholstery were redesigned.

References

External links

18
Cars introduced in 1931
1930s cars